Juhani Siljo (3 May 1888 – 6 May 1918) was a Finnish poet and translator.

Siljo was born as Johan Alarik Sjögren in Oulu. He completed the Oulun Lyseon Lukio upper secondary school in 1907, and started studies in the University of Helsinki at the same year, but never graduated, instead he focused on writing. He wrote poems, essays and translated authors like Novalis, Friedrich Schiller, Goethe, Friedrich Nietzsche and Charles Baudelaire.

Siljo also worked as an editor in the newspaper Helsingin Sanomat and the periodical Valvoja. From 1915 to 1916 he worked as a library assistant in Jyväskylä.

Siljo was on the side of the White Guards in the Finnish Civil War. He was wounded and captured by the Red Guards in a battle in Orivesi. He died in a military hospital in Tampere after the Battle of Tampere had ended in the victory of the Whites.

Selected works

Poetry 
Runoja (WSOY 1910)
Maan puoleen (1914)
Selvään veteen (Otava 1919)

Others 
Rajankäyntejä : Esseitä kirjallisuudesta 1910-1917 (Essays on literature) (Suomalaisen kirjallisuuden seura 1991)
Seppelöity : murheellinen komedia (Play) (WSOY 1918)

References

External links
 

1888 births
1918 deaths
19th-century Finnish people
People from Oulu
Finnish male poets
Finnish-language poets
Finnish translators
People of the Finnish Civil War (White side)
Translators to Finnish
Writers from Northern Ostrobothnia
20th-century Finnish poets
20th-century translators
19th-century translators
19th-century male writers
20th-century male writers
Translators of Charles Baudelaire
Translators of Johann Wolfgang von Goethe